ComplyAdvantage, founded in 2014, is a RegTech company that provides anti-money laundering technology. The company uses artificial intelligence, machine learning and natural language processing to help regulated organisations manage risk obligations and counteract financial crime.

History 
ComplyAdvantage was founded in London, United Kingdom, in 2014 by Charles Delingpole. The company was initially set up as a RegTech solutions provider for businesses to comply with anti-money laundering (AML) and counter financing of terrorism (CFT) requirements. Prior to this, in 2002, Delingpole founded The Student Room, an online community for students based in the United Kingdom. He sold the company in 2006 and then founded MarketFinance, a FinTech company, alongside Anil Stocker and Ilya Kondrashov, in 2011.

The company has acquired a total of $88.2 million through three series of venture capital funding. In October 2016, the company raised $8.2 million Series A funding. It then raised $30 million in Series B and $50 million in Series C in January 2019 and July 2020, respectively. The funding rounds were led by Balderton Capital, Index Ventures, and Ontario Teacher's Pension Plan board.

In 2019, ComplyAdvantage received the Best RegTech Solution award at Finovate. The company was named a Technology Pioneer by World Economic Forum in 2020. It was ranked 87th on Financial Times list of Europe's 1000 fastest growing companies.

ComplyAdvantage was one of six British FinTech companies chosen by the Department of International Trade (DIT) for its third mission to Finnosummit, an international financial technology conference that takes place in Latin America.

In 2022, Vatsa Naraimha was promoted to the postition of CEO with Charles Delingpole moving to the role of Executive Chairman.

Services 
The funding was used by ComplyAdvantage to introduce new services and set up offices in the United States, Singapore, and Romania. As of 2020, the company offers AML onboarding and monitoring, AML transaction monitoring, payment screening, and politically exposed persons (PEPs) and adverse media screening. ComplyAdvantage also offers real-time sanctions and watch list screening using global lists maintained by the Office of Foreign Assets Control (OFAC), European Union (EU), United Nations (UN), Department of Foreign Affairs and Trade (DFAT), and other governmental, law enforcement, and regulatory databases.

Partnerships 

In 2020, sync., an open banking platform, partnered with ComplyAdvantage to integrate its AML and anti-fraud features in their mobile application. Kompli-Global also entered into a strategic partnership with ComplyAdvantage in 2020 to include its real-time sanctions and PEP screening features in its remote corporate onboarding platform, Kompli-QED.

See also
Anti-money laundering software

References 

Software companies of the United States
Companies based in the City of London
Business software companies
Companies established in 2014
Software companies of the United Kingdom
Open-source intelligence
Online companies of the United Kingdom